Tropical cyclones are non-frontal, low-pressure systems that develop, within an environment of warm sea surface temperatures and little vertical wind shear aloft. Within the Australian region, tropical cyclones have been officially named since the 1963–64 Australian region cyclone season, though several meteorological papers show that a few tropical cyclones were named before 1964–65. The names of significant tropical cyclones that cause a high amount of damage and/or loss of life are retired from the lists of tropical cyclone names by the World Meteorological Organization's RA V Tropical Cyclone Committee at their bi-annual meeting. Storms named by Port Moresby are automatically retired regardless of their impact due to their infrequent occurrence.

Within the Australian region, there have been a total of 114 tropical cyclone names retired, with the 1990s accounting for 44 of these. Among the retired storms are Cyclones Gwenda and Inigo, two of the most intense systems ever recorded in the Southern Hemisphere; both attained a barometric pressure of 900 hPa (26.58 inHg). The deadliest cyclone to have its named retired was Cyclone Seroja in 2021, which killed 272 people in Indonesia, East Timor and Australia, while the most damaging system to have its name retired was Severe Tropical Cyclone Tracy in 1974 which devastated the city of Darwin, leaving A$ (A$ 2019 AUD; US$ 2019 USD) in losses.

Background

Within the region the credit for the first usage of personal names for weather systems, is generally given to the Queensland Government Meteorologist Clement Wragge, who named systems between 1887 and 1907. Wragge used names drawn from the letters of the Greek alphabet, Greek and Roman mythology and female names, to describe weather systems including tropical cyclones over Australia, New Zealand and the Antarctic. After the new Australian government had failed to create a federal weather bureau and appoint him director, Wragge started naming cyclones after political figures. This system of naming weather systems subsequently fell into disuse for several years after Wragge retired, before the Australian Bureau of Meteorology started to use female names for tropical cyclones in the region during the 1963–64 cyclone season.

During the International Women's Year of 1975 the Australian Science Minister ordered that tropical cyclones, within the Australian region, should carry both men's and women's names. This was because the minister thought "that both sexes should bear the odium of the devastation caused by cyclones." As a result, male names were added to the lists of names for both basins, ahead of the 1975–76 season.

The practice of retiring significant names was started during 1955 by the United States Weather Bureau in the Northern Atlantic basin, after hurricanes Carol, Edna, and Hazel struck the Northeastern United States and caused a significant amount of damage in the previous year. Initially the names were only designed to be retired for ten years after which they might be reintroduced, however, it was decided at the 1969 Interdepartmental hurricane conference, that any significant hurricane in the future would have its name permanently retired. Several names have been removed from the Pacific naming lists for various other reasons than causing a significant amount of death/destruction, which include being pronounced in a very similar way to other names and  political reasons.

Tropical cyclone names retired

1960s

|-
| Audrey ||  || bgcolor=#| || bgcolor=#| || bgcolor=#| || Northern Territory, Queensland || Extensive ||  ||
|-
| Flora ||  || bgcolor=#| || bgcolor=#| || bgcolor=#| || Northern Territory, Queensland || Extensive ||  ||
|-
| Dinah ||  || bgcolor=#| || bgcolor=#| || bgcolor=#| || Queensland || Severe || None ||
|-
! 3 names !! 7 January 1964 – 31 January 1967 !!  !!  !!  !! !! Severe !! None !! 
|}

1970s

|-
| Ada ||  || bgcolor=#| || bgcolor=#| || bgcolor=#| || Queensland ||  ||  ||
|-
| Dora ||  || bgcolor=#| || bgcolor=#| || bgcolor=#| || Queensland || Widespread ||  ||
|-
| GertieFiona ||  || bgcolor=#| || bgcolor=#| || bgcolor=#| || Northern Territory, Queensland || ||  ||
|-
| Althea ||  || bgcolor=#| || bgcolor=#| || bgcolor=#| || Queensland ||  ||  ||
|-
| Daisy ||  || bgcolor=#| || bgcolor=#| || bgcolor=#| || Queensland ||  ||  ||
|-
| Emily ||  || bgcolor=#| || bgcolor=#| || bgcolor=#| || Queensland || ||  ||
|-
| Madge ||  || bgcolor=#| || bgcolor=#| || bgcolor=#| || Northern Territory, Queensland || ||  ||
|-
| Wanda ||  || bgcolor=#| || bgcolor=#| || bgcolor=#| || Queensland, New South Wales ||  ||  ||
|-
| Tracy ||  || bgcolor=#| || bgcolor=#| || bgcolor=#| || Northern Territory ||  ||  ||
|-
| Trixie ||  || bgcolor=#| || bgcolor=#| || bgcolor=#| || Western Australia ||  ||  ||
|-
| Joan ||  || bgcolor=#| || bgcolor=#| || bgcolor=#| || Western Australia ||  ||  ||
|-
| Beth ||  || bgcolor=#| || bgcolor=#| || bgcolor=#| || Queensland ||  ||  ||
|-
| Ted ||  || bgcolor=#| || bgcolor=#| || bgcolor=#| || Queensland || ||  ||
|-
| Alby ||  || bgcolor=#| || bgcolor=#| || bgcolor=#| || Western Australia ||  ||  ||
|-
! 14 names !! 1 January 1970 – 5 April 1978 !! !!  !!  !! !! $1.62 billion !! 111 !!
|}

1980s

|-
| Simon ||  || bgcolor=#| ||  bgcolor=#| ||  bgcolor=#| || Queensland, New Zealand ||  ||  ||
|-
| Cliff ||  || bgcolor=#| || bgcolor=#| || bgcolor=#| || New Caledonia, Queensland, Vanuatu || Unknown ||  ||
|-
| Elinor ||  || bgcolor=#| ||  bgcolor=#| ||  bgcolor=#| || Queensland ||  ||  ||
|-
| Jane ||  || bgcolor=#| || bgcolor=#| || bgcolor=#|  || Western Australia ||  ||  ||
|-
| Kathy ||  || bgcolor=#| || bgcolor=#| || bgcolor=#| || Cape York Peninsula, Northern Territory ||  ||  ||
|-
| Lance ||  || bgcolor=#| || bgcolor=#| || bgcolor=#| || Queensland || ||  ||
|-
| Nigel ||  || bgcolor=#| || bgcolor=#| || bgcolor=#| || Vanuatu, Fiji || ||  ||
|-
| Sandy ||  || bgcolor=#| || bgcolor=#| || bgcolor=#| || Northern Territory, Western Australia || ||  ||
|-
| Margot ||  || bgcolor=#| || bgcolor=#| || bgcolor=#| || Western Australia || ||  ||
|-
| Winifred ||  || bgcolor=#| || bgcolor=#| || bgcolor=#| || Queensland || $ ||  ||
|-
| Manu ||  || bgcolor=#| || bgcolor=#| || bgcolor=#| || Papua New Guinea, Queensland || Extensive ||  ||
|-
| Connie ||  || bgcolor=#| || bgcolor=#| || bgcolor=#| || Western Australia || ||  ||
|-
| Jason ||  || bgcolor=#| || bgcolor=#| || bgcolor=#| || Northern Territory || ||  ||
|-
| Elsie ||  || bgcolor=#| || bgcolor=#| || bgcolor=#| || Western Australia || ||  ||
|-
| Agi ||  ||  bgcolor=#| || bgcolor=#| || bgcolor=#| || Papua New Guinea, New Caledonia || ||  ||
|-
| Charlie ||  || bgcolor=#| || bgcolor=#| || bgcolor=#| || Queensland ||  ||  ||
|-
| Herbie ||  ||  bgcolor=#| || bgcolor=#| || bgcolor=#| || Western Australia || $ ||  ||
|-
| Ilona ||  ||  bgcolor=#| || bgcolor=#| || bgcolor=#| || Western Australia || $ ||  ||
|-
| Delilah ||  || bgcolor=#| || bgcolor=#| || bgcolor=#| || New Caledonia, New Zealand || ||  ||
|-
| Ned ||  || bgcolor=#| || bgcolor=#| || bgcolor=#| || Western Australia ||  ||  ||
|-
| Aivu ||  || bgcolor=#||| bgcolor=#| || bgcolor=#| || Queensland ||  ||  ||
|-
| Orson ||  || bgcolor=#||| bgcolor=#| || bgcolor=#| || Western Australia ||  ||  ||
|-
| Pedro ||  || bgcolor=#| || bgcolor=#| || bgcolor=#| || Cocos Island ||  ||  ||
|-
| Felicity ||  || bgcolor=#| ||  bgcolor=#| ||  bgcolor=#| || Cape York Peninsula ||  ||  ||
|}

1990s

|-
| Tina ||  || bgcolor=#| || bgcolor=#| || bgcolor=#| || Western Australia ||  ||  ||
|-
| Ivor ||  || bgcolor=#| || bgcolor=#| || bgcolor=#| || Cape York Peninsula ||  ||  ||
|-
| Joy ||  || bgcolor=#| || bgcolor=#| || bgcolor=#| || Solomon Islands, Queensland ||  ||  ||
|-
| Daphne ||  || bgcolor=#| || bgcolor=#| || bgcolor=#| || Northern Australia ||  ||  ||
|-
| Fifi ||  || bgcolor=#| || bgcolor=#| || bgcolor=#| || Western Australia ||  ||  ||
|-
| Mark ||  || bgcolor=#| || bgcolor=#| || bgcolor=#| || Queensland, Northern Territory ||  ||  ||
|-
| Ian ||  || bgcolor=#| || bgcolor=#| || bgcolor=#| || Western Australia || ||  ||
|-
| Nina ||  || bgcolor=#| || bgcolor=#| || bgcolor=#| || Queensland, Tonga, Papua New Guinea, Solomon Islands, Wallis and Futuna ||  ||  ||
|-
| Lena ||  || bgcolor=#| || bgcolor=#| || bgcolor=#| ||  ||  ||  ||
|-
| Oliver ||  || bgcolor=#| || bgcolor=#| || bgcolor=#| || Queensland || ||  ||
|-
| Roger ||  || bgcolor=#| || bgcolor=#| || bgcolor=#| || Solomon Islands, New Caledonia || ||  ||
|-
| Adel ||  || bgcolor=#| || bgcolor=#| || bgcolor=#| || Papua New Guinea ||  ||  || 
|-
| Naomi ||  || bgcolor=#| || bgcolor=#| || bgcolor=#| || Western Australia || ||  ||
|-
| Pearl ||  || bgcolor=#| || bgcolor=#| || bgcolor=#| || None ||  ||  ||
|-
| Quenton ||  || bgcolor=#| || bgcolor=#| || bgcolor=#| ||   ||  ||  ||
|-
| Theodore ||  || bgcolor=#| || bgcolor=#||| bgcolor=#| || Papua New Guinea, Solomon Islands, New Caledonia || Unknown || 1 ||
|-
| Sharon ||  || bgcolor=#| || bgcolor=#| || bgcolor=#| || Indonesia, Western Australia ||  ||  ||
|-
| Annette ||  || bgcolor=#| || bgcolor=#| || bgcolor=#| || Western Australia, South Australia || ||  ||
|-
| Bobby ||  || bgcolor=#| || bgcolor=#| || bgcolor=#| || Northern Territory, Western Australia || ||  ||
|-
| Violet ||  || bgcolor=#| || bgcolor=#| || bgcolor=#| || Lord Howe Island, New South Wales ||  ||  ||
|-
| Warren ||  || bgcolor=#| || bgcolor=#| || bgcolor=#| || Queensland, Northern Territory || ||  ||
|-
| Chloe ||  || bgcolor=#| || bgcolor=#| || bgcolor=#| || Northern Territory, Western Australia ||  ||  ||
|-
| Agnes ||  || bgcolor=#| || bgcolor=#| || bgcolor=#| ||  ||  ||  ||
|-
| Frank ||  || bgcolor=#| || bgcolor=#| || bgcolor=#| || Western Australia ||  ||  ||
|-
| Gertie ||  || bgcolor=#| || bgcolor=#| || bgcolor=#| || Australia || ||  || 
|-
| Barry ||  || bgcolor=#| || bgcolor=#| || bgcolor=#| || Queensland ||  ||  ||
|-
| Celeste ||  ||  bgcolor=#| || bgcolor=#| || bgcolor=#| || Queensland || ||  ||
|-
| Ethel ||  || bgcolor=#| || bgcolor=#| || bgcolor=#| || Queensland, Northern Territory || ||  ||
|-
| Kirsty ||  || bgcolor=#| || bgcolor=#| || bgcolor=#| || Western Australia || ||  ||
|-
| Olivia ||  || bgcolor=#| || bgcolor=#| || bgcolor=#| || Western Australia, South Australia || ||  ||
|-
| Lindsay ||  || bgcolor=#| || bgcolor=#| || bgcolor=#| ||  ||  ||  ||
|-
| Fergus ||  || bgcolor=#| || bgcolor=#| || bgcolor=#| || Solomon Islands, New Zealand || ||  ||
|-
| Rachel ||  || bgcolor=#| || bgcolor=#| || bgcolor=#| || Northern Territory, Western Australia ||  ||  ||
|-
| Justin ||  || bgcolor=#| || bgcolor=#| || bgcolor=#| || Papua New Guinea, Queensland ||  ||  ||
|-
| Rhonda ||  || bgcolor=#| || bgcolor=#| || bgcolor=#| || Cocos Islands, Western Australia ||  ||  ||
|-
| Katrina ||  || bgcolor=#| || bgcolor=#| || bgcolor=#| || Solomon Islands, Vanuatu, Queensland ||  ||  || 
|-
| Sid ||  || bgcolor=#| || bgcolor=#| || bgcolor=#| || Northern Territory ||  ||  ||
|-
| Thelma ||  || bgcolor=#| || bgcolor=#| || bgcolor=#| || Northern Territory, Western Australia  || ||  ||
|-
| Rona ||  || bgcolor=#| || bgcolor=#| || bgcolor=#| || Eastern Australia, New Caledonia ||  ||  ||
|-
| Vance ||  || bgcolor=#| || bgcolor=#| || bgcolor=#| || Northern Territory, Western Australia || - ||  ||
|-
| Elaine ||  || bgcolor=#| || bgcolor=#| || bgcolor=#| || Western Australia || ||  ||
|-
| Gwenda ||  || bgcolor=#| || bgcolor=#| || bgcolor=#| || Western Australia || Minimal ||  ||
|-
| John ||  || bgcolor=#| || bgcolor=#| || bgcolor=#| || Western Australia ||  ||  ||
|}

2000s

|-
| Steve ||  || bgcolor=#| || bgcolor=#| || bgcolor=#| || Northern Australia, Western Australia ||  ||  ||
|-
| Tessi ||  || bgcolor=#| || bgcolor=#| || bgcolor=#| || Queensland ||  ||  ||
|-
| Rosita ||  || bgcolor=#| || bgcolor=#| || bgcolor=#| || Western Australia || ||  ||
|-
| Sam ||  || bgcolor=#| || bgcolor=#| || bgcolor=#| || North-Western Australia || ||  ||
|-
| Abigail ||  || bgcolor=#| || bgcolor=#| || bgcolor=#| || Northern Territory, Queensland || ||  ||
|-
| Upia ||  || bgcolor=#| || bgcolor=#| || bgcolor=#| || Papua New Guinea ||  ||  ||
|-
| Erica ||  || bgcolor=#| || bgcolor=#| || bgcolor=#| || Queensland, New Caledonia || ||  ||
|-
| Graham ||  ||  bgcolor=#| || bgcolor=#| || bgcolor=#| || Western Australia ||  ||  ||
|-
| Inigo ||  || bgcolor=#| || bgcolor=#| || bgcolor=#| || Indonesia, Western Australia || ||  ||
|-
| Epi ||  || bgcolor=#| || bgcolor=#| || bgcolor=#| || Papua New Guinea ||  ||  ||
|-
| Monty ||  || bgcolor=#| || bgcolor=#| || bgcolor=#| || Western Australia || ||  ||
|-
| Fay ||  || bgcolor=#| || bgcolor=#| || bgcolor=#| || North-Western Australia || ||  ||
|-
| Harvey ||  || bgcolor=#| || bgcolor=#| || bgcolor=#| || Northern Territory || ||  ||
|-
| Ingrid ||  || bgcolor=#| || bgcolor=#| || bgcolor=#| || Papua New Guinea, Northern Australia || ||  ||
|-
| Clare ||  || bgcolor=#| ||  bgcolor=#| || bgcolor=#| || Western Australia  ||  ||  ||
|-
| Larry ||  || bgcolor=#| || bgcolor=#| || bgcolor=#| || Queensland  ||  ||  ||
|-
| Glenda ||  || bgcolor=#| || bgcolor=#| || bgcolor=#| || Western Australia ||  ||  ||
|-
| Monica ||  || bgcolor=#| || bgcolor=#||| bgcolor=#| || Queensland, Northern Territory ||  ||  ||
|-
| George ||  || bgcolor=#| || bgcolor=#| || bgcolor=#| || North-Western Australia ||  || 2 ||
|-
| Guba ||  || bgcolor=#| || bgcolor=#| || bgcolor=#| || Papua New Guinea ||  ||  || 
|-
| Helen ||  || bgcolor=#| || bgcolor=#| || bgcolor=#| || Northern Territory || ||  ||
|-
| Durga ||  || bgcolor=#| || bgcolor=#| || bgcolor=#| || None ||  ||  ||
|-
| Hamish ||  || bgcolor=#|Category 5 tropical cyclone || bgcolor=#| || bgcolor=#| || Queensland ||  || 2 || 
|-
| Laurence ||  || bgcolor=#| || bgcolor=#| || bgcolor=#| || Western Australia ||  ||  ||
|}

2010s

|-
| Magda ||  || bgcolor=#| || bgcolor=#| || bgcolor=#| || Western Australia ||  ||  ||
|-
| Carlos ||  || bgcolor=#| || bgcolor=#| || bgcolor=#| || Northern Territory, Western Australia ||  ||  || 
|-
| Heidi ||  || bgcolor=#| || bgcolor=#| || bgcolor=#| || Western Australia || Minimal || None ||
|-
| Jasmine ||  || bgcolor=#| || bgcolor=#| || bgcolor=#| || Vanuatu, New Caledonia, Tonga || || ||
|-
| Lua ||  || bgcolor=#| || bgcolor=#| || bgcolor=#|  || Western Australia ||  || None || 
|-
| Oswald ||  || bgcolor=#| || bgcolor=#| || bgcolor=#| || Eastern Australia ||  ||  ||
|-
| Rusty ||  || bgcolor=#| || bgcolor=#| || bgcolor=#| || Western Australia ||  ||  ||
|-
| Christine ||  || bgcolor=#| || bgcolor=#| || bgcolor=#| || Western Australia  ||  ||  ||
|-
| Ita ||  || bgcolor=#| || bgcolor=#| || bgcolor=#| || Solomon Islands, Queensland, Papua New Guinea, New Zealand ||  ||  ||
|-
| Lam ||  || bgcolor=#| || bgcolor=#| || bgcolor=#| || Northern Australia ||  ||  ||
|-
| Marcia ||  || bgcolor=#| || bgcolor=#| || bgcolor=#| || Queensland ||  ||  ||
|-
| Olwyn ||  || bgcolor=#| || bgcolor=#| || bgcolor=#| || Western Australia ||  ||  ||
|-
| Debbie ||  || bgcolor=#| || bgcolor=#| || bgcolor=#| || Queensland ||  || 14 ||
|-
| Marcus ||  || bgcolor=#| || bgcolor=#| || bgcolor=#| || Northern Territory, Western Australia ||  || None || 
|-
| Trevor ||  || bgcolor=#| || bgcolor=#| || bgcolor=#| || Queensland, Northern Territory || > || None ||
|-
| Veronica ||  || bgcolor=#| || bgcolor=#| || bgcolor=#| || Western Australia ||  || None || 
|}

2020s

|-
| Damien ||  || bgcolor=#| || bgcolor=#| || bgcolor=#| || Western Australia ||  || None || 
|-
| Harold ||  || bgcolor=#| || bgcolor=#| || bgcolor=#| || Papua New Guinea, Solomon Islands, Vanuatu, Fiji, Tonga ||  || ≥30 ||
|-
| Mangga ||  || bgcolor=#| || bgcolor=#||| bgcolor=#| || Western Australia ||  ||  ||
|-
| Seroja ||  || bgcolor=#| || bgcolor=#| || bgcolor=#| || Indonesia, East Timor, Western Australia ||  || 272 ||
|-
| Seth ||  || bgcolor=#| || bgcolor=#| || bgcolor=#| || Northern Territory, Queensland ||  || 4 ||
|-class="sortbottom"
|}

See also

List of retired Atlantic hurricane names
List of retired Pacific hurricane names
List of retired Pacific typhoon names
List of retired Philippine typhoon names
List of retired South Pacific cyclone names

Notes

References

 List
Australian cyclone names retired
Tropical cyclones in Oceania
cyclone names